Asa F. Martin (June 25, 1900 – August 15, 1979) was an American old-time musician, singer, and guitarist, who made many recordings during the 1920s and 1930s and was closely associated with renowned fiddle player Doc Roberts, for whom he played rhythm guitar. In turn, Roberts frequently played mandolin on Martin's recordings; Roberts' son James also sang duets with Martin under the name Doc Roberts Trio.

Biography
Martin was born in Winchester, Kentucky, into a music-loving family. His mother, who was a piano teacher, also played the guitar, and his father played the fiddle. Because of low finances, Martin decided to drop out of medical school and try his hand at a career in music. In the early 1920s, he played in several dance bands, and in the meantime, he worked in a cinema as a background musician for silent movies. With the advent of talking pictures, he had to find another job. Martin met fiddler Doc Roberts at a fiddler's convention in Winchester. They began performing together, and soon, Martin and Roberts went to Richmond, Indiana, for a recording session. Martin made his recording debut with Doc Roberts on May 14, 1928, for Gennett Records. They recorded two songs at their  first session together, "Second Love", and "Lost Love"'. Their recordings sold well, and Martin soon became one of the best-selling old-time artists of Gennett Records. At their second session in August 1928, Doc Roberts' son James was added as a singer. In 1931, the band switched to ARC Records. In addition to being a recording star, Martin performed on radio stations in Kentucky and Cincinnati, Ohio. In 1935, he hired an aspiring young banjo player, David Akeman. Martin gave Akeman the moniker "String Beans" during an onstage presentation when he could not remember the banjo player's name. The name eventually became "Stringbean".

Martin's pseudonym on the Champion label was Jesse Coats.

Martin retired from music in the 1940s and went to work at a steel plant in Ohio. In the 1950s, he moved to Irvine, Kentucky, where he had purchased land just outside the town. He resumed his musical career on a small-scale basis in the 1960s with his new band, the Cumberland Rangers. In the early 1970s, they recorded an album for Rounder Records, Dr. Ginger Blue. Martin died at home in 1979 from a heart attack.

References

Further reading
 Russell, Tony (2007) Country Music Originals: The Legends and the Lost, Oxford University Press
 Russell, Tony - Pinson, Bob (2004) Country Music Records: A Discography 1921-1942, Oxford University Press
 Wolfe, Charles K. (2001) Classic Country: Legends of Country Music, Routledge, 2001

External links

 

1900 births
1979 deaths
Gennett Records artists
People from Winchester, Kentucky
People from Irvine, Kentucky
20th-century American singers
Old-time musicians
Folk musicians from Kentucky
Singers from Kentucky
20th-century American guitarists
Guitarists from Kentucky
American male guitarists
20th-century American male singers